Duncan is a census-designated place (CDP) in Hancock County, Iowa, United States. The population was 131 at the 2010 census.

History
Duncan was platted in 1900. The community's population was 25 in 1902, and 20 in 1925.

Geography

Demographics

Education
Duncan is a part of the Garner–Hayfield–Ventura Community School District. It was previously in the Garner–Hayfield Community School District, which merged into the current GHV district on July 1, 2015.

References

Census-designated places in Iowa
Census-designated places in Hancock County, Iowa